Stenoptilia orites is a moth of the family Pterophoridae. It is found in New Zealand.

The larvae feed on the flowers of Senecio and Brachyglottis species.

References

Moths described in 1884
orites
Moths of New Zealand